Blanche of France (– 1 March 1305), a member of the House of Capet, was Duchess of Austria and Styria as consort to the Habsburg Duke Rudolph III, eldest son of King Albert I of Germany.

Life
Blanche was born in Paris, the second child of King Philip III of France and his second wife, Maria of Brabant. Her siblings were Louis, Count of Évreux and Margaret, Queen of England. Blanche also had two older half-brothers from her father's first marriage: Philip, the future King of France, and Charles, Count of Valois.

Betrothals
Blanche was betrothed four times before her eventual marriage. Her first betrothal was to John I, Marquis of Namur, in September 1290. Her second betrothal was on 31 July 1291 to Edward, Prince of Wales, but he would instead marry Blanche's niece Isabella.

Her third betrothal took place in 1293 and was to the Prince of Wales's father, Edward I of England, who had been widowed three years earlier. Edward broke off his son's betrothal to Blanche after hearing of her beauty and sent emissaries to negotiate the intended union with her half-brother, King Philip IV. Philip agreed to give Blanche to Edward on the following conditions:
A truce would be concluded between the two countries; and
Edward would cede the province of Gascony to France.

Edward agreed and sent his brother Edmund Crouchback, Earl of Lancaster, to fetch the new bride, but Lancaster discovered that Blanche was already betrothed to another. Philip instead offered Edward her younger sister Margaret, who was at the time only eleven years old. Edward refused Margaret's hand and instead declared war on France. Five years later Edward and Philip declared a truce under which Edward would marry Margaret (then a more mature 16 years of age) and receive both the territory of Guienne and the sum of £15,000, which was owed to Margaret.

Her fourth betrothal, in 1296, was to John, son of John II, Count of Holland.

Marriage
As King Albert I of Germany aimed at a dynastic relation with the French royal House of Capet, he had entered into negotiations with the Paris court about 1295. Blanche married Rudolph on 25 May 1300; however, she did not arrive in Vienna until Christmas. The Austrian court admired her rich endowment, but also noted a taste for luxury and pomp. The duchess accompanied her husband on a journey to the Styrian lands, where she proved supportive to the Habsburg pretensions.

Blanche bore Rudolf a stillborn daughter in 1304 and a short-lived son who was probably poisoned in March 1306. She died on 1 March 1305, possibly of complications after a miscarriage.

Since 1784, Blanche is buried at the Minoritenkirche in Vienna. Upon her death, Rudolf secondly married the Piast princess Elizabeth Richeza of Poland.

References

Sources

External links

1282 births
1305 deaths
French princesses
House of Capet
Austrian royal consorts
Daughters of kings
Burials in Vienna